Šatorsko Lake is a lake in the western part of Bosnia and Herzegovina located at 1488 metres above sea level, directly below Šator mountain (1872 m) in the Dinaric Alps.

The lake has a glacial origin and is 250 metres long and 120 metres wide, with the deepest point being 6 metres. The summer temperature is 17 °C while the source on the shore, which feeds it, is 6 °C. A few hundred metres to the north is the Bulino Vrelo spring, which is believed by the local population to have healing powers.

See also 
 Prekajsko Lake
 Unac River
 Drvar
 Neretva

References

External links
Commission to Preserve National Monuments of Bosnia and Herzegovina

Lakes of Bosnia and Herzegovina
Mountain lakes
Tourist attractions in Bosnia and Herzegovina